Sirimalwatte Pallegama Grama Niladhari Division is a Grama Niladhari Division of the Kundasale Divisional Secretariat of Kandy District of Central Province, Sri Lanka. It has Grama Niladhari Division Code 653.

Degaldoruwa Raja Maha Vihara and Yakgahapitiya are located within, nearby or associated with Sirimalwatte Pallegama.

Sirimalwatte Pallegama is a surrounded by the Deekirimadawala, Amunugama South, Degaldoruwa, Lewellagama and Sirimalwatta East Grama Niladhari Divisions.

Demographics

Ethnicity 

The Sirimalwatte Pallegama Grama Niladhari Division has a Sinhalese majority (98.7%). In comparison, the Kundasale Divisional Secretariat (which contains the Sirimalwatte Pallegama Grama Niladhari Division) has a Sinhalese majority (82.6%)

Religion 

The Sirimalwatte Pallegama Grama Niladhari Division has a Buddhist majority (98.6%). In comparison, the Kundasale Divisional Secretariat (which contains the Sirimalwatte Pallegama Grama Niladhari Division) has a Buddhist majority (81.4%)

Gallery

References 

Grama Niladhari divisions of Sri Lanka
Kandy District
Geography of Kandy District